A waddy is an Australian Aboriginal hardwood club.

Waddy may also refer to:

People 
Waddy (surname)
Waddy Butler Wood (1869-1944), American architect
Watkin Tudor Jones (born 1974), South African musician
Waddy Wachtel (born 1947), American musician and record producer

Other uses 
Acacia peuce, an Australian tree 
Waddy, Kentucky, United States, an unincorporated community within Shelby County
Waddy House, a historic home in Maryland, United States

See also 
Stack Waddy, a British blues rock band
Wadi (disambiguation)